Senecio ampullaceus,  also known as Texas ragwort, Texas squaw-weed, Texas groundsel, 
and Texas butterweed, 
is a species of Senecio in the family Asteraceae, receiving its Latin name ampullaceus from its flask shaped flower-head.  
It is recommended for landscape use in its native Texas.

Description
The seedlings of S. ampullaceus often have a purplish color on the undersides of their leaves in the winter, especially along their midrib.  Flowering in early–mid spring, Texas ragwort is a tall annual, 

Stems and leaves:
The leaves with broadly winged leaf stalks, grow from single stems; the nodes between leaves getting shorter and shorter higher on the stem. Leaves at the lower portion of the plant have more teeth on their edges than the leaves at the upper portion of the mature plant.

Stems and leaves are covered loosely and unevenly with a mat of fine hairs, occasionally having no hairs.

Flowers:
Flowering stalks have 10 to 30 flower heads which as a group make a flat top to the whole plant.

Fruits:
One seeded fruits with rigid pappus.

Roots:
Roots relatively thin and branching.

Distribution

Native:

Nearctic:
North-central United States: Missouri
Southeastern United States: Arkansas
South-central United States: Texas
or 
Southeastern United States: Arkansas
South central United States: Texas

Current:
Nearctic:
North-central United States: Missouri, Oklahoma
Southeastern United States: Arkansas
South-central United States: Texas

Varieties or subspecies which are synonyms
Senecio ampullaceus var. floccosus Engelm. & A. Gray
Senecio ampullaceus var. glaberrimus Engelm. & A. Gray

References

External links

ampullaceus
Flora of Texas
Flora of North America